William Ward Pinkett, Jr. (April 29, 1906—March 15, 1937) was an American jazz trumpeter and scat vocalist active during the Harlem Renaissance. A respected sideman recognized as a "hot" trumpet and with a versatile ear, he played and recorded with various bands in New York City. His career was cut short by alcoholism.

Discography 

All recordings took place in New York City. An asterisk (*) indicates vocal in addition to trumpet.

Original issues 

The year and label information for the first vinyl release.

Lost, unissued, or posthumous releases 

Over the years alternate and unissued takes have been released in compilations of various bandleaders. In the table below, the first date indicates the recording date. The year of issue follows the label information for the first release.

References and sources

References

Sources

 
 
 
 

Discographies of American artists
Jazz discographies